Toceno is a comune (municipality) in the Province of Verbano-Cusio-Ossola in the Italian region Piedmont, located about  northeast of Turin and about  north of Verbania.

Toceno borders the following municipalities: Craveggia, Santa Maria Maggiore.

References

Cities and towns in Piedmont